The 2017 Chengdu Challenger was a professional tennis tournament played on hard courts. It was the 2nd edition of the tournament which was part of the 2017 ATP Challenger Tour. It took place in Chengdu, China between 31 July and 6 August 2017.

Singles main-draw entrants

Seeds

 1 Rankings are as of July 24, 2017.

Other entrants
The following players received wildcards into the singles main draw:
  Gao Xin
  Sun Fajing
  Wu Yibing
  Zhang Zhizhen

The following players received entry into the singles main draw using a protected ranking:
  Farrukh Dustov
  James Ward

The following players received entry from the qualifying draw:
  Chung Yun-seong
  He Yecong
  Sidharth Rawat
  Kento Takeuchi

Champions

Singles

  Lu Yen-hsun def.  Evgeny Donskoy 6–3, 6–4.

Doubles

  Sriram Balaji /  Vishnu Vardhan def.  Hsieh Cheng-peng /  Peng Hsien-yin 6–3, 6–4.

References

Chengdu Challenger
2017
2017 in Chinese tennis